is one of the eleven wards in the city of Kyoto, in Kyoto Prefecture, Japan.

History 
It was created in 1929 when it was split off from Shimogyō-ku. During the years 1931 to 1976 it also covered the area of present-day Yamashina-ku, which was an independent town until its merger into the city in 1931. The name literally means "Eastern Mountain District".

Due to the restrictions against urban development, the population inside the ward is continually decreasing. Higashiyama-ku has the lowest population of all the wards in Kyoto, and a disproportionate number of elderly people.

Geography 
Interposed between the Kamo River and the Higashiyama mountain range, Higashiyama-ku is roughly bounded by the Sanjō street in the north, and the Jūjō street in the south. Historically, this area lay outside the official boundaries of the city of Kyoto. The western part consists mainly of residential areas, whereas the eastern part is covered by forests. In the north, between the Kamo River and Higashi-oji street, there is a commercial district, and in the south there is a semi-industrial zone.

Demographics

Sights 
Many of the locations central to the development of 15th-century Japanese culture known as Higashiyama Bunka are found here or in Sakyō-ku. Both the entertainment district of Gion in front of Yasaka Shrine, and the area around the stone-paved roads Ninenzaka and Sannenzaka that lead up to the World Heritage Kiyomizu Temple, enjoy protected status to preserve the traditional style buildings. Other temples and shrines in the ward include Tōfuku-ji, Kennin-ji, Kōdai-ji, and Sanjūsangen-dō.

The Kyoto National Museum is also located inside Higashiyama-ku, as well as the Namikawa Cloisonne Museum.

Education 
 Kyoto Women's University
 
 Kacho College
 Kyoto International Junior and Senior High School (Educational Foundation Kyoto International School) is in the ward.

Gallery

References

External links 

 
  

Wards of Kyoto